Franconian may refer to:
anything related to Franconia (German Franken), a historic region in Germany, now part of Bavaria, Thuringia and Baden-Württemberg
East Franconian German, a dialect spoken in Franconia
Franconian languages
Franconian (stage), a stage in North American stratigraphy named for the Franconia Formation, near the town of Franconia in eastern Minnesota
Franconian notation, mensural musical notation as formulated by Franco of Cologne in the 13c

See also
 Name of the Franks
Frankish (disambiguation)
Franks (disambiguation)